The 1873 Edinburgh and St. Andrews Universities by-election was held on 4 December 1873.  The byelection was held due to the incumbent Liberal MP, Lyon Playfair, becoming Postmaster General.  It was retained by Playfair, who was unopposed.

References

1873 elections in the United Kingdom
1873 in Scotland
1870s elections in Scotland
1870s in Edinburgh
19th century in Fife
By-elections to the Parliament of the United Kingdom in Edinburgh and St Andrews Universities
Unopposed ministerial by-elections to the Parliament of the United Kingdom in Scottish constituencies
December 1873 events